The UP Sherpa Bi is a German two-place paraglider that was designed and produced by UP Europe of Kochel am See. Introduced in 2001, production of the second generation model Sherpa 2 ended in 2007.

Design and development
The aircraft was designed as a tandem glider for flight training and as such was referred to as the Sherpa Bi, indicating "bi-place" or two seater.

The Sherpa went through two generations of models, the Sherpa and Sherpa 2.

The Sherpa's sail was made from Porsher Marine New Skytex and its lines were fabricated from Cousin Trestec Super Aramid.

Variants
Sherpa
Original model, in production 2001-2004. The glider model is Deutscher Hängegleiterverband e.V. (DHV) 1-2 certified.
Sherpa 2
Second generation model, in production 2004-2007. The glider model is DHV 1-2 certified.

Specifications (Sherpa)

References

Sherpa
Paragliders